Acta Philosophica Fennica is a peer-reviewed academic journal published by the Philosophical Society of Finland.

The journal was established in 1935. From 1968 to 1981 it was distributed by North-Holland Publishing (Amsterdam, now Elsevier), and since 1981 by the Academic Bookstore (Helsinki). The Acta Philosophica Fennica covers all areas of philosophy. Originally, the journal was published in German, but nowadays the articles are in English.

The current editor in chief is Ilkka Niiniluoto (University of Helsinki).

See also 
 List of philosophy journals

References

External links 
 

Philosophy journals
English-language journals
Publications established in 1935
Irregular journals